The following highways are numbered 645:

United States